Petra Kvitová was the defending champion, but lost to Roberta Vinci in the third round.

Venus Williams won the title defeating Garbiñe Muguruza in the final, 6–3, 3–0, ret., despite being a match point down in the semifinals in the third set against Vinci.

Seeds
The top eight seeds received a bye into the second round.

Draw

Finals

Top half

Section 1

Section 2

Bottom half

Section 3

Section 4

Qualifying

Seeds

Qualifiers

Lucky loser

Draw

First qualifier

Second qualifier

Third qualifier

Fourth qualifier

Fifth qualifier

Sixth qualifier

Seventh qualifier

Eighth qualifier

References 

 Draws

Singles